Dig the New Breed was the final album by The Jam, excluding compilations released after the group's split in December 1982. It is a collection of live performances recorded between 1977 and 1982.

Track listing
All songs written by Paul Weller except as indicated.

Side one
"In the City"  (100 Club, London, 11 September 1977)
"All Mod Cons" (the Rainbow, London, 13 December 1979)
"To Be Someone (Didn't We Have a Nice Time)" (the Rainbow, London, 13 December 1979)
"It's Too Bad" (the Rainbow, London, 13 December 1979)
"Start!" (the Hammersmith Palais, London, 14 December 1981)
"Big Bird" (Eddie Floyd) (the Hammersmith Palais, London, 14 December 1981)
"Set the House Ablaze" (the Hammersmith Palais, London, 14 December 1981)

Side two
"Ghosts" (Bingley Hall, Birmingham, England, 21 March 1982)
"Standards" (Reading University, 16 February 1979)
"In the Crowd" (the Edinburgh Playhouse, 6 April 1982)
"Going Underground" (Glasgow Apollo, 8 April 1982)
"Dreams of Children" (Glasgow Apollo, 8 April 1982)
"That's Entertainment" (Glasgow Apollo, 8 April 1982)
"Private Hell" (Glasgow Apollo, 8 April 1982)

Chart performance

Dig the New Breed spent 16 weeks on the UK album charts, rising to No. 2. In the U.S., the album spent 9 weeks on the Billboard 200 album charts and reached its peak position of No. 131 in February 1983.

References

The Jam albums
1982 live albums
1982 compilation albums
Polydor Records live albums